Simon Qamunga (born November 20, 1967) is a Tanzanian long-distance runner who represented his country in the 1996 Summer Olympics in Atlanta, Georgia.  He competed in the men's marathon event, placing 92nd.  He would go on to coach running in Arusha.

Achievements

External links
Profile
Morani Police to feature in Kilimanjaro Marathon

1967 births
Living people
Tanzanian male long-distance runners
Athletes (track and field) at the 1996 Summer Olympics
Olympic athletes of Tanzania